Stade de Reims won Division 1 season 1959/1960 of the French Association Football League with 60 points.

Participating teams

 Angers SCO
 Bordeaux
 Le Havre AC
 RC Lens
 Limoges FC
 Olympique Lyonnais
 AS Monaco
 OGC Nice
 Nîmes Olympique
 RC Paris
 Stade de Reims
 Stade Rennais UC
 AS Saint-Etienne
 UA Sedan-Torcy
 FC Sochaux-Montbéliard
 Stade Français FC
 RC Strasbourg
 SC Toulon
 Toulouse FC
 US Valenciennes-Anzin

Final table

Promoted from Division 2, who will play in Division 1 season 1960/1961
 FC Grenoble: Champion of Division 2
 FC Nancy: runner-up of Division 2
 FC Rouen: Third place
 AS Troyes-Savinienne: Fourth place

Results

Top goalscorers

References
 Division 1 season 1959-1960 at pari-et-gagne.com

Ligue 1 seasons
French
1